Pleasant Township is one of the fifteen townships of Seneca County, Ohio, United States.  The 2010 census found 1,635 people in the township.

Geography
Located in the northern part of the county, it borders the following townships:
Ballville Township, Sandusky County - north
Green Creek Township, Sandusky County - northeast corner
Adams Township - east
Scipio Township - southeast corner
Clinton Township - south
Hopewell Township - southwest corner
Liberty Township - west
Jackson Township, Sandusky County - northwest corner

No municipalities are located in Pleasant Township, although it contains the unincorporated communities of Fort Seneca and Old Fort in the northern part of the township.

Name and history
Pleasant Township was organized in 1831.

It is one of fifteen Pleasant Townships statewide.

Government
The township is governed by a three-member board of trustees, who are elected in November of odd-numbered years to a four-year term beginning on the following January 1. Two are elected in the year after the presidential election and one is elected in the year before it. There is also an elected township fiscal officer, who serves a four-year term beginning on April 1 of the year after the election, which is held in November of the year before the presidential election. Vacancies in the fiscal officership or on the board of trustees are filled by the remaining trustees.

Township officials

References

External links
Township website
County website

Townships in Seneca County, Ohio
Townships in Ohio